Shakara is an album by Nigerian Afrobeat composer, bandleader, and multi-instrumentalist Fela Kuti, recorded in Lagos in 1971 and originally released on the Nigerian EMI label.

Reception

AllMusic commented: "Kuti was highly eclectic, and his innovative, visionary music contained elements of funk/soul, jazz, and blues, as well as African music. That eclectic spirit proves to be a major asset on Shakara, which consists of two 13-minute performances by Kuti's Africa 70 band".

Track listing
All compositions by Fela Kuti 
 "Lady" – 13:47  
 "Shakara (Oloje)" – 13:26

Personnel
Fela Kuti – tenor saxophone, alto saxophone, electric piano, vocals
Tony Njoku – trumpet
Igo Chico – tenor saxophone
Lekan Animashaun – baritone saxophone
Segun Edo, Tutu Shorunmu – guitar
Tommy James – bass guitar
Tony Allen – drums
James Abayomi – percussion
Isaac Olaleye – maracas
Henry Koffi, Daniel Koranteg – congas

References

Fela Kuti albums
1972 albums
Afrobeat albums
EMI Records albums
Yoruba-language albums